

Films

Highest-grossing films

In-Year Release

Notes

References

External links
Weekend box office figures | BFI

2023
United Kingdom
2023 in British cinema